Pelle viva (Scorched Skin) is a 1962 Italian drama film written and directed by Giuseppe Fina.

The film entered the 23rd Venice International Film Festival, in which it received a special mention. In 2008 it was restored and shown as part of the retrospective "Questi fantasmi: Cinema italiano ritrovato" at the 65th Venice International Film Festival.

Plot  
The story of Rosaria, a woman from Apulia, who works in Milan and returns to her village each Saturday to see her illegitimate little boy, who is in a charitable institution.

Cast 
 Elsa Martinelli: Rosaria
 Raoul Grassilli: Andrea Morelli
 Lia Rainer
 Narcisa Bonati
 Franco Sportelli  
 Franco Nero

References

External links

1962 films
Italian drama films
1962 drama films
Italian black-and-white films
Films scored by Carlo Rustichelli
1962 directorial debut films
1960s Italian-language films
1960s Italian films